Mary McGarey Madkour (April 12, 1927 – January 7, 2013) was a Republican politician who elected to two terms in the Vermont House of Representatives, serving from 1993 to 1997. She was unsuccessful in her 1996 bid for reelection.

Electoral history

References

External links
 

1927 births
2013 deaths
People from Swanton (town), Vermont
Republican Party members of the Vermont House of Representatives
Women state legislators in Vermont
20th-century American politicians
20th-century American women politicians
21st-century American women